The 6th Arkansas Cavalry Regiment was a cavalry regiment of the Confederate States Army during the American Civil War.

Officially designated by the State Military Board as the 6th Regiment Arkansas Cavalry, it was usually called Monroe's 1st Arkansas Cavalry and occasionally the 4th Arkansas Cavalry, and more rarely the 1st Trans-Mississippi Cavalry.

References

Units and formations of the Confederate States Army from Arkansas
1865 disestablishments in Arkansas
Military units and formations disestablished in 1865